Truncatella guerinii is a species of very small land snail that lives at the edge of the sea, a gastropod mollusk in the family Truncatellidae.

Description
The length of the shell attains 9.5 mm.

Distribution
This species has a wide distribution:

Japan, Pratas Island, Taiwan, the Philippines, Thailand, Micronesia, New Caledonia; also off Madagascar.

References 

 Gould, A. A. (1847). Descriptions of four species of Truncatella from the collections of the Exploring Expedition. Proceedings of the Boston Society of Natural History. 2: 208–209.
 Habe T. (1961). Coloured illustrations of the shells of Japan (II). Hoikusha, Osaka. xii + 183 + 42 pp., 66 pls.
 Tan S.K. & Low M.E.Y. (2014) Singapore Mollusca: 6. The family Truncatellidae (Gastropoda: Caenogastropoda: Truncatelloidea). Nature in Singapore 7: 25–30.
 Fischer-Piette, E. & Vukadinovic, D. (1974). Les Mollusques terrestres des Iles Comores. Mémoires du Museum National d'Histoire Naturelle, Nouvelle Série, Série A, Zoologie, 84: 1-76, 1 plate. Paris.
  Fischer-Piette, E., Blanc, C.P., Blanc, F. & Salvat, F. (1993). Gastéropodes terrestres prosobranches. Faune de Madagascar, 80: 1–281. page(s): 208
 Vermeulen, J.J. & Whitten, A.J. (1998). Guide to the land snails of Bali, 164. Leiden: Backhuys.
 Griffiths, O.L. & Florens, V.F.B. (2006). A field guide to the non-marine molluscs of the Mascarene Islands (Mauritius, Rodrigues and Réunion) and the northern dependencies of Mauritius. Bioculture Press: Mauritius. Pp. i–xv, 1–185.
 Minato, H. (1988). A systematic and bibliographic list of the Japanese land snails. H. Minato, Shirahama, 294 pp., 7 pls.
 Greķe, K. & Slapcinsky, J. (2021). New Taheitia H. et A. Adams, 1863, with revisional notes on the Papuan Truncatellidae (Caenogastropoda: Truncatelloidea). In: Telnov D., Barclay M. V. L. & Pauwels O. S. G. (eds). Biodiversity, biogeography and nature conservation in Wallacea and New Guinea. Vol. 4: 135–184. The Entomological Society of Latvia, Rīga, 443 pp.
 Brook, F. J. (2010). Coastal landsnail fauna of Rarotonga, Cook Islands: systematics, diversity, biogeography, faunal history, and environmental influences. Tuhinga. 21: 161-252
 Liu, J.Y. [Ruiyu] (ed.). (2008). Checklist of marine biota of China seas. China Science Press. 1267 pp.

External links
 Villa, A. & Villa, J. B. (1841). Dispositio systematica conchyliarum terrestrium et fluviatilium quae adservantur in collectione fratrum Ant. et Jo. Bapt. Villa. Conspectu abnormitatum novarumque specierum descriptionibus adjectis. 62 pp. (+ 2 pp. Resumptus numeralis specierum + Errata)
 Pfeiffer, L. (1846). Monographischer Versuch über die Gattung Truncatella Risso. Zeitschrift für Malakozoologie. 3(12): 177-190
 Pease, W. H. (1868). Descriptions of new species of land snails inhabiting Polynesia. American Journal of Conchology. 3(3): 223-230, pl. 15
 Crosse H. (1868). Diagnoses Molluscorum novorum. Journal de Conchyliologie. 16(2): 174-178.
 Cox, J. C. (1868). A monograph of Australian land shells. W. Maddock. Sydney. 111 pp
 Pease, W. H. (1871). Catalogue of the land-shells inhabiting Polynesia, with remarks on their synonymy, distribution, and variation, and descriptions of new genera and species. Proceedings of the Zoological Society of London. (1871): 449-477
 Tapparone Canefri, C. (1886). Fauna malacologica della Nuova Guinea i delle isole adiacenti. Parte I. - Molluschi estramarini. Supplemento 1. Annali del Museo civico di Storia Naturale di Genova, Series 2. 24: 113-200
 Clench, W. J. & Turner, R. D. (1948). A catalogue of the family Truncatellidae with notes and descriptions of new species. Occasional Papers on Mollusks. 1(13): 157-212, 4 plates

Truncatellidae
Endemic fauna of Japan
Gastropods described in 1841
Taxonomy articles created by Polbot